Eliza Doolittle is a character from the play Pygmalion and My Fair Lady, a musical adaptation of the play.

Eliza Doolittle may also refer to:
 Eliza (English singer), English singer and songwriter formerly known as Eliza Doolittle
 Eliza Doolittle (EP), an EP by Eliza Doolittle
 Eliza Doolittle (album), an album by Eliza Doolittle